Djin Djin is the eighth studio album by Beninese singer Angélique Kidjo. It was released on April 27, 2007, on Razor & Tie. The album won Best Contemporary World Music Album at the 2008 Grammy Awards.

Track listing
All tracks composed by Angélique Kidjo and Jean Hebrail; except where indicated

Personnel
 	Producer – Tony Visconti
 	Drums – Poogie Bell 
 	Bass – Habib Faye
 	Guitar – Dominic Kanza (tracks: 1, 11, 12), Lionel Loueke (tracks: 3, 5, 6)
 	Guitar [African] – Joao Mota
 	Guitar [Solo] – Amadou Bagayoko (tracks: 5), Keziah Jones (tracks: 4, 10)
 	Acoustic Guitar – Romero Lubambo
 	Steel Guitar – Larry Campbell (tracks: 9, 11, 12)
 	Keyboards – Amp Fiddler, Onree Gill (tracks: 2)
 	Percussion – Benoit Avihoue, Crespin Kpitiki
 	Backing Vocals [South African] – Nompumelelo Skakane, Thandi Bhengu, Tsholofetso Mokubung
 	Saxophone [Solo] – Branford Marsalis (tracks: 2)
 	Horns – Aaron Johnson (tracks: 3, 8), Colin Stetson (tracks: 3, 8), Jordan McLean (tracks: 3, 8), Stuart Bogie (tracks: 3, 8)
 	Strings – Gabriel Schaff, Gregor Kitzis, Matt Goeke, Ron Lawrence
 	Engineer – Dror Mohar, Mario J. McNulty
 	Mastered By – George Marino
 	Mixed By – Russell Elevado (tracks: 2, 4), Tony Visconti (tracks: 1, 3, 5 )

Charts

Release history

References

2007 albums
Albums produced by Tony Visconti
Albums recorded at Electric Lady Studios
Angélique Kidjo albums
Grammy Award for Best Contemporary World Music Album
Razor & Tie albums